Andrew Barry Moore (March 7, 1807 – April 5, 1873) was the 16th Governor of the U.S. state of Alabama from 1857 to 1861 and served as Governor at the outbreak of the American Civil War.

Early life
Moore was born in Spartanburg District, South Carolina, to Jane and Charles Moore, a cotton planter and veteran of the American Revolution and the War of 1812. Moore's father purchased land in Perry County, Alabama, in 1820, and his family moved there, although the younger Moore remained in school in South Carolina before joining his family in 1826.

Career
After teaching school at Marion in Perry County for two years, Moore read law, and was admitted to the bar in 1833. For eight years, he served as Justice of the Peace for Perry County.

In 1839 Moore was elected to the Alabama House of Representatives as a Democrat, reelected in 1842, and served four consecutive terms. Elected Speaker of the House in 1843, 1844, and 1845, Moore worked closely with Governor Benjamin Fitzpatrick in the liquidation of the State Bank. Moore advocated the relocation of the state capitol to Montgomery and delivered the last speech in the old Hall of the House of Representatives in Tuscaloosa.

Moore resumed his law practice in 1846. He was a presidential elector for Democratic candidate Lewis Cass in 1848. Appointed by Governor Henry W. Collier in 1851 to fill a vacancy on the circuit bench, Moore served in that capacity until 1857, when he accepted the Democratic Party's nomination for governor. He was elected without opposition.

Education and internal improvements received significant attention during Moore's first term. Construction was completed on the Alabama Insane Hospital at Tuscaloosa, and Dr. Peter Bryce was appointed its first superintendent. The Institute for the Deaf and Blind was established at Talladega. The Medical College, a branch of the University of Alabama, was established at Mobile. Moore advocated state aid supplemented by Federal land grants to promote railroad construction. He particularly favored efforts of the Alabama and Alabama River Railroad to connect the northern and southern areas of the state.

Then considered a moderate on the slavery issue, Moore defeated the extremist William F. Samford, in the gubernatorial election of 1859. Although he became more concerned with the defense of slavery after John Brown's raid on the U.S. Arsenal at Harper's Ferry, Virginia, in October 1859, Moore continued to recommend caution. Nevertheless, the state legislature enacted a law to provide for a state military organization in February 1860. The law established a Military Commission composed of the governor, an adjutant and inspector general, a quartermaster general, and a state army of eight thousand volunteers. The legislature also approved a resolution requiring the governor, in the event of a "black Republican" being elected president, to call for the election of delegates to a state convention "to consider, determine, and do whatever necessary to protect the interests of the state." On December 24, 1860, Moore issued writs of election, leading to the Secession Convention of 1861.

Between the November 1860 election of Abraham Lincoln and the meeting of the Alabama Convention on January 7, 1861, Moore took several decisive steps to safeguard the state's financial status and defensive capabilities. He urged banks to suspend specie payments and to exchange large amounts of capital for state bonds. He ordered the state militia to seize the U.S. Army arsenal at Mt. Vernon and Forts Morgan and Gaines on Mobile Bay. He contributed more than five hundred troops to assist Florida Governor Madison S. Perry in capturing the U.S. Army forts at Pensacola.

When the government of the Confederate States of America was organized in Montgomery in February 1861, Moore used his influence to help secure the election of the conservative Jefferson Davis over the more radical William Lowndes Yancey.

After he left office, Moore was appointed special aide-de-camp by Governor John Gill Shorter, and he worked to coordinate the procurement and transportation of supplies to General Albert Sidney Johnston in northern Alabama. Following the surrender of Robert E. Lee at Appomattox, Moore was arrested by Federal troops and imprisoned at Fort Pulaski in Savannah, Georgia, with other Confederate leaders. Released in August 1865, he returned to Marion, Alabama, and resumed law practice.

Personal life

In 1832, he married Mary Goree, the daughter of a local planter. They resided in Marion, Alabama.

Death
He died in 1873.

References

 Alabama Department of Archives and History

1807 births
1873 deaths
People from Spartanburg County, South Carolina
American people of Scotch-Irish descent
Democratic Party governors of Alabama
Confederate States of America state governors
Speakers of the Alabama House of Representatives
Democratic Party members of the Alabama House of Representatives
Alabama state court judges
American justices of the peace
Alabama lawyers
American lawyers admitted to the practice of law by reading law
19th-century American politicians
19th-century American judges
People of Alabama in the American Civil War